Cascadia Con was the eighth North American Science Fiction Convention, held in SeaTac, Washington, on September 1–5, 2005, at the Seattle Airport Hilton and Conference Center.  This NASFiC was held because Glasgow, Scotland, was selected as the location for the 2005 Worldcon.

Guests of honor
 Fred Saberhagen, writer (unable to attend due to illness)
 Liz Danforth, artist
 Kevin Standlee, fan
 Marc Abrahams, science
 Toni Weisskopf, editor
 Uffington Horse, special filk guest
 Hiroaki Inoue, anime
 Harry Harrison, special author guest (unable to attend due to illness)

Information

Events
 The first American showing of Charlie Jade was presented at Cascadia Con by Jeffrey Pierce and Robert Wertheimer.
 Trailers of Robotech: The Shadow Chronicles were first shown at Cascadia Con, presented by Chase Masterson.
 John and Bjo Trimble, with Marah Searle-Kovacevic, hosted a wake for James Doohan.

Heinlein Award
The Heinlein Award was presented by the Heinlein Society to Larry Niven and Jerry Pournelle.

Site selection
The Seattle bid won by "5 or 6" votes out of the roughly 400 cast.

At Cascadia Con, St. Louis won the vote for the 9th North American Science Fiction Convention in 2007. This is only the second time which a NASFiC site selection vote has been held at a NASFiC.

Notable program participants

 Marc Abrahams
 Heather Alexander
 C. J. Cherryh
 Julie Czerneda
 William C. Dietz
 Jane Fancher
 Sheila Finch
 Michael F. Flynn
 Robin Hobb
 Chase Masterson
 Larry Niven
 Diana L. Paxson
 John Pelan
 Jerry Pournelle
 Kristine Kathryn Rusch
 Stalking Cat
 Bjo Trimble
 Dan Woren
 Tommy Yune

Anthology
The anthology Northwest Passages was sponsored by Cascadia Con and released at the convention.  It was published by Windstorm Creative  and edited by Cris DiMarco. Over 950 authors submitted stories for this anthology, of which 25 were selected for publication.

Committee
Cascadia Con was held under the auspices of SWOC, the Seattle Westercon Organizing Committee.

 Chair: Bobbie DuFault

Division heads
 Finance Vice-Chair: Susan Robinson
 Administration Vice-Chair: Pat Porter
 Facilities: Glenn Glazer
 Operations: Marah Searle-Kovacevic, Cheryl Ferguson
 Information Technology Systems: Jerry Gieseke
 Membership Services: Dave Schaber
 Hospitality: Jackie Sherry
 Publications: Allyn Llyr
 Programming: Alex von Thorn
 Special Events: Michael Kemnir
 Video/Film: Bruce E. Durocher II

Bid
 Bid Chair: Bobbie DuFault
 Bid Vice-Chair: Alex von Thorn

See also
 World Science Fiction Society
 Seattle
 SeaTac

References

External links
 Official Site (mirror?)
 NASFiC Official Site
 Northwest Passages anthology
 City of SeaTac, WA Official Site

North American Science Fiction Convention
Festivals in the Puget Sound region
2005 in the United States
2005 in Washington (state)